Takht Bhai is a tehsil located in Mardan District, Khyber Pakhtunkhwa, Pakistan. The population is 626,523 according to the 2017 census.

See also 
 List of tehsils of Khyber Pakhtunkhwa

References 

Tehsils of Khyber Pakhtunkhwa
Populated places in Mardan District